Pydnaodes is a monotypic moth genus in the family Erebidae erected by George Hampson in 1911. Its only species, Pydnaodes distincta, was first described by Walter Rothschild in 1909. It is found in the upper Amazon region.

References

Phaegopterina
Monotypic moth genera
Moths described in 1909
Moths of South America